Anveshane is a 1983 Kannada movie directed and co-written by T.S. Nagabharana, released in 1983. It starred Anant Nag, Smita Patil and Girish Karnad playing the pivotal roles. Nagabharana remade the movie in Hindi with Om Puri titled Bin Bulaye Mehmaan (1981), but the film was incomplete.

Plot
In the mid-1980s, Shaam (Anant Nag) and Revati (Smita Patil) live in a Vatara (housing complex) with a host of other families and two little girls. A ‘vatara’ is a set of houses that are usually owned by one person and inhabited by many families. Shaam works for a travel agency while Revati is a school teacher. Both are working hard to make ends meet in a social structure that has been making it increasingly difficult for the middle class. There is a lot of affection and love in this family that lives under the prying nose of old, perverted and goofy men who are married to nosy, loud and annoying women. Day in and day out the couple follows a standard routine which involves everyday chores of getting the kids ready for school, making breakfast and heading off to work. The house is locked all day until they all return in the evening.

Ajja (Balakrishna) is the inquisitive old man who has nothing else to do all day except suspect every single event that occurs around him. Ajja starts hearing radio sounds from the otherwise empty and locked house. This becomes a regular affair before the couple realizes something is amiss. They start noticing the fact that someone visits their home when they are not around. When the couple returns one evening they are shocked out of their living minds when they find a corpse right in the middle of their living room. Shekhar (Sunder Raj) playing the dead body itself is the victim who seems to have been killed by an unknown hand. Fear and tension strikes the innocent couple whose main problem up until now was to get their daughters to wear shoes for school. They spend an entire night wondering what to do with their unwelcome guest that includes hiding him under their own bed and getting rid of his wallet. Their attempts at getting rid of the corpse go futile thanks to drunks and policemen who strategically appear out of nowhere. Somehow they manage to put the corpse in one of the rooms and the quest (Anveshane) about why he died in their house begins.

Dharwad-chap Rotti (Girish Karnad) visits them one day looking for Shekhar. Shaam starts tracing Rotti and manages to end up in a rather amusing face-off with him one fine day. The story unfolds as we start picking up the chips of the story from Rotti's eyes. His connection with Shekhar unravels and all the pieces of this puzzle seem to fall into place.

Cast
Smita Patil as Revathi
Anant Nag as Shyam
Girish Karnad as Rotti
Sundar Raj as Shekhar
Balakrishna as Ajja
Ramesh Bhat
Pramila

Soundtrack

Awards and honors
 Karnataka State Film Awards - Third Best film

References

External links

1980s Kannada-language films
1983 films
Films scored by Vijaya Bhaskar
Films directed by T. S. Nagabharana